Dhake Ki Malmal is a 1956 Indian Hindi-language romantic musical comedy directed by J. K. Nanda and produced under the Nanda Films banner. The film stars Madhubala and Kishore Kumar in lead roles, while Jeevan, Om Prakash and Jagdeep are among the supporting cast.

Dhake Ki Malmal was the first film to star Kumar and Madhubala together, who would later act in several popular musical comedies which include classics like Chalti Ka Naam Gaadi (1958) and Half Ticket (1962). The music was composed by O. P. Nayyar. The print of Dhake Ki Malmal was lost by the studio just after few years of its release, making it a lost film.

Cast 
 Madhubala as Shivana
 Kishore Kumar as Jeeva
 Om Prakash 
 Jagdeep
 Jeevan
 Ulhas
 Sajjan as Kalicharan
 Raj Mehra
 Rajen Haksar
 Shyam Kumar

Soundtrack 
The music director was O. P. Nayyar with D. N. Madhok, Jan Nisar Akhtar and Saroj Mohini Nayyar being the three lyricists. The playback singing was given by Kishore Kumar, Asha Bhosle, Manna Dey, Shamshad Begum and C. H. Atma.

Reception

Critical reception 
A Cineplot review praised Dhake Ki Malmal  extensively. It wrote that director J.K. Nanda brought the film on the screen with "vivid authenticity and poignant human appeal." It praised Madhubala for playing the leading lady well: "Madhubala [...] gives what is probably the finest performance of her career so far in the picture’s most captivating and important role."

Box office 
Revenue wise, it was the sixteenth highest-grossing film of 1956 and a moderate commercial success.

References

External links 
 

1956 films
1950s Hindi-language films
Films scored by O. P. Nayyar
Indian romantic musical films
1956 romantic comedy films
1950s romantic musical films
Indian romantic comedy films
Indian black-and-white films